Paloma Marcos Sanches Silva (born 21 May 1977) is a Brazilian actress, best known as Paloma Duarte for Two Sons of Francisco (2005), Leo e Bia (2010) and Soulbound (2011).

References

Brazilian film actresses
Living people
1977 births
Place of birth missing (living people)